A Challenge for Robin Hood is a 1967 British adventure film directed by C. M. Pennington-Richards and starring Barrie Ingham, Peter Blythe and John Arnatt.

Plot
When the father of the De Courtenay family dies, the brothers argue about the inheritance. Although rightfully most should go to Robin, his cousin Roger takes control after killing his brother and blaming Robin, and Robin has to go into hiding in the forest, taking Friar Tuck with him. The two come under attack from the Sheriff of Nottingham's soldiers but are saved by a mystery archer. This is Alan-a-Dale, who takes them to his forest hide-out.

The gang test his archery skills with a hood over his head, and agree he is a natural leader. They decide to call him Robin Hood.

Back in the De Courtenay castle, Roger sits with the Sheriff and Maid Marion and they watch a wrestling match. It is won by Little John. They plan to hang Will Scarlet, Robin's friend, who was captured at the time of Robin's escape, at the village fair.

Robin stops Sir Jamyl de Penitone in the forest and challenges him to a sword duel. He learns of Will Scarlet's pending hanging. Robin robs him of the tax money he has collected.

Robin and his men next stop a drayman and a pie seller traveling with him. They commandeer the cart-load of pies and Tuck disguises himself as the pie-seller, while Robin disguises himself as a monk. They go to the De Courteney fair, where they buy a lot of green cloth to better hide in the woods. A soldier recognises Robin but is sympathetic to his cause. Robin puts on a mask and volunteers for the prize wrestling match with Little John. John recognises him and they stage the fight so Robin wins. When he goes to collect his prize he grabs Marion and puts her on a horse for the loyal soldier to carry her off. He is arrested and is to be hung with Will Scarlet, but a pie fight begins and the soldiers are driven back. Little John goes back to the forest with them.

In the forest the men take revenge on the tax collector and start returning the tax money to the peasants.

The Sheriff's men trick Robin and his men into thinking the forest is on fire and while they investigate they kidnap Marion and her little brother, and kill Much, who was guarding them. Robin tries to rescue them but is captured too. Three of Robin's men (led by Little John) put fake ducks on their head and swim over the castle moat, despite a guard who fancies duck for dinner, and fires a crossbow at them. The three enter via an iron yett at basement level. They take a dumb waiter from the kitchen to the great hall, announcing that a "special dish" is coming up. They release Robin who was roasting in front of the fire and let other men in. A fight begins with the soldiers.

Roger and Robin end in a sword duel watched by Marion. Alan-a-Dale ends it with an arrow in Roger's back.

Back in the forest Friar Tuck marries Robin and Marion.

Cast
 Barrie Ingham as Robin de Courtenay, alias Robin Hood 
 Peter Blythe as Sir Roger de Courtenay 
 John Arnatt as the Sheriff of Nottingham
 Gay Hamilton as Lady Marian Fitzwarren 
 John Gugolka as Stephen Fitzwarren, the boy 
 James Hayter as Friar Tuck
 Eric Flynn as Alan-a-Dale 
 Reg Lye as Much 
 Leon Greene as Little John 
 Douglas Mitchell as Will Scarlett 
 Eric Woofe as Henry de Courtenay
 John Harvey as Wallace, Sir Roger's chief henchman 
 Arthur Hewlett as Edwin, the castle steward 
 John Graham as Justin, a loyal guard 
 Jenny Till as The Imposter Lady Marian 
 William Squire as Sir John de Courtenay 
 Norman Mitchell as Dray Driver 
 Alfie Bass as The Pie Seller 
 Donald Pickering as Sir Jamyl de Penitone

Critical reception
The New York Times wrote, "Challenge for Robin Hood is excellent...it should make ideal viewing for lads, from little sprouts up to about 14...The screenplay by Peter Bryan fiddles a bit with the old Robin Hood legend, but it is a snug story and the dialogue has bite and humor...C. M. Pennington-Richards, has piloted the action with crackle, the musical score is fine and the color ranges from good to beautiful...the fairly modest budget seldom shows".

Box office
According to Fox records, the film required $950,000 in rentals to break even and by 11 December 1970 had made $675,000.

References

External links
 

British adventure films
Hammer Film Productions films
1967 films
1967 adventure films
Films directed by C. M. Pennington-Richards
Robin Hood films
1960s English-language films
1960s British films